Betta aurigans is a species of gourami endemic to the island of Natuna Besar, north-west of the island of Borneo The species name aurigans is so named after the Latin for gold (aurum), due to the colouring of the scales of the fish. According to Linke, they live in "blackwater swamp regions"

References

aurigans
Fish described in 2004